Rolf Danneberg (born 1 March 1953 in Hamburg) is a former German athlete who, representing West Germany, won the gold medal in discus throw at the 1984 Summer Olympics with 66.60 metres. He won the Olympic bronze medal in 1988 in Seoul.

Biography
In addition he finished eleventh at the 1986 European Championships, fourth at the 1987 World Championships and sixth at the 1990 European Championships.

His personal best throw was 67.60 metres, achieved in May 1987 in Berlin. This result ranks him eighth among German discus throwers, behind Jürgen Schult, Lars Riedel, Wolfgang Schmidt, Armin Lemme, Hein-Direck Neu, Alwin Wagner and Michael Möllenbeck. He is a three-time national champion for West Germany in the discus throw.

He currently works as a trainer, coaching Markus Münch for the 2009 World Championships in Berlin.

References

1953 births
Living people
West German male discus throwers
Olympic athletes of West Germany
Athletes (track and field) at the 1984 Summer Olympics
Athletes (track and field) at the 1988 Summer Olympics
Olympic gold medalists for West Germany
Olympic bronze medalists for West Germany
Athletes from Hamburg
Medalists at the 1988 Summer Olympics
Medalists at the 1984 Summer Olympics
Olympic gold medalists in athletics (track and field)
Olympic bronze medalists in athletics (track and field)